Nərimankənd is a village and municipality in the Sabirabad Rayon of Azerbaijan. It has a population of 2,330.

References

Populated places in Sabirabad District